Abaji is a local government area in the Federal Capital Territory of Nigeria, Abuja. The city is the land of the Gbagyi, Bassa, Egbira, Ganagana, and Hausa people. The majorities were Bassa, Gbagyi, Egbira and Ganagana. The first settlement in Abuja are Gbagyi, Bassa, Egbira and Tiv people before the Usman Danfodio religious war came to Northcentral, Abuja South.After the kinship throne was won by Egbira people from the Tiv people, they ruled kinship and allow the Hausa to be the Imam of the city the name used to be Igabazi (meaning: A territory carved by Abazhi), and is one of the area council in Abuja. Abaji kingdom headed by the Ona of Abaji (chairman FCT Council of chiefs) is the oldest traditional institution in Federal Capital Territory, Nigeria. The land was under the old Koton Karfe kingdom but agreed to join the federal capital territory for developmental purposes. Hon. Abubakar Umar Abdullahi of the All Progressives Congress (APC) became the chairman of Abaji Area Council in the February 12, 2022 chairmanship election of the FCT.

In 2016, Abaji has an area of 992 km and populations of 98,000. Abaji has proposed Abuja University of Technology (AUTA) to be commissioned soon, it was located at Agyana road. Nestle bottling company is also situated at Awawa, alongside Gwagwalada / Lokoja Express Way. In the Area council, there is a reasonable supply of electricity and the town is surrounded by the all-season rivers (Azako, Ashara, and Ukya). The people are civilized and when it comes to education they are not left behind. The area council consists of ten wards which are:

 Nuku/Sabon Gari/Manderegi
 Abaji Central
 Abaji North East
 Abaji South East
 Gurdi
 Rimba/Ebagi
 Agyana/Pandagi
 Gawu
 Yaba
 Alu/Mamagi

Abaji shares a boundary with three states in Nigeria which are Nassarawa, Niger, and Kogi states.

Some notable men in Abaji:

Alhaji Adamu Baba Yunusa

Sheikh Ramalan Mansur

Sheikh Abdullahi Makeri

Alhaji Muhammadu Gani

Alhaji Umaru Abdullahi

Alhaji Musa Usman Sokodabo

Mallam Adamu Shuaibu

Senator Adamu Sidi Ali

Mallam Muhammad Inuwa Ashafa

Mallam Hassan Garba

Professor Zakari Muhammad

Liman Abdulkadir

Liman Babachana

The postal code of the area is 905101.

References

External links

 Official Website

Local Government Areas in the Federal Capital Territory (Nigeria)
Populated places in the Federal Capital Territory (Nigeria)